Nabziniguima is a town in the Pella Department of Boulkiemdé Province in central western Burkina Faso. It has a population of 923.

References

Populated places in Boulkiemdé Province